Alfred Younges Kirkland Sr. (October 6, 1917 – March 19, 2004) was a United States district judge of the United States District Court for the Northern District of Illinois.

Education and career

Born in Elgin, Illinois, Kirkland received a Bachelor of Arts degree from University of Illinois at Urbana–Champaign in 1941 and a Juris Doctor from University of Illinois College of Law in 1943. He was in private practice in Chicago, Illinois in 1943, but quickly left his practice to serve in the United States Army as a lieutenant in the infantry from 1943 to 1946. He was in private practice in Elgin from 1946 to 1973, also serving as a special assistant state attorney general of Illinois from 1969 to 1973. He was a judge of the Circuit Court of Illinois for the 16th Judicial Circuit from 1973 to 1974.

Federal judicial service

On December 11, 1974, Kirkland was nominated by President Gerald Ford to a seat on the United States District Court for the Northern District of Illinois vacated by Judge William J. Bauer. Kirkland was confirmed by the United States Senate on December 19, 1974, and received his commission on December 21, 1974. He assumed senior status due to a certified disability on April 30, 1979, and served in that capacity until his death on March 19, 2004, in Elgin.

References

Sources
 

1917 births
2004 deaths
Illinois state court judges
Judges of the United States District Court for the Northern District of Illinois
United States district court judges appointed by Gerald Ford
20th-century American judges
United States Army officers
University of Illinois College of Law alumni
United States Army personnel of World War II